Beware the Heavens is the first album by the power metal band Sinergy, released in 1999. The album features two instrumental tracks "Born Unto Fire and Passion" and "Pulsation", and a track inspired by the series Xena: The Warrior Princess, entitled "The Warrior Princess". Some melodies that can be heard in the song "Beware the Heavens" were sampled from a song called "Translucent image" by IneartheD (now known as Children of Bodom); the song is featured on IneartheD's 1995 demo Ubiquitous Absence Of Remission. This is the only album where Jesper Strömblad (In Flames guitarist) plays guitar alongside Alexi Laiho; his position was filled in by Roope Latvala on all subsequent albums.

Track listing

Credits

Sinergy
Kimberly Goss – vocals, keyboards
Alexi Laiho – guitar, additional vocals (Track 2)
Jesper Strömblad – guitar
Sharlee D'Angelo – bass guitar
Ronny Milianowicz – drums

Other personnel
Fredrik Nordström – Production, Engineering, Mixing
Göran Finnberg – Mastering

References

1999 debut albums
Sinergy albums
Nuclear Blast albums
Albums produced by Fredrik Nordström